Funneling may refer to:
Using a funnel (a pipe with a wide, often conical mouth and a narrow stem)
Funneling, the process of using a beer bong
Funneling at the internal orifice of the uterus

See also
Funnel (disambiguation)